This is a list of flag bearers who have represented Yugoslavia at the Olympics.

Flag bearers carry the national flag of their country at the opening ceremony of the Olympic Games.

See also
Yugoslavia at the Olympics
List of flag bearers for Bosnia and Herzegovina at the Olympics
List of flag bearers for Croatia at the Olympics
List of flag bearers for Kosovo at the Olympics
List of flag bearers for Montenegro at the Olympics
List of flag bearers for North Macedonia at the Olympics
List of flag bearers for Serbia at the Olympics
List of flag bearers for Serbia and Montenegro at the Olympics
List of flag bearers for Slovenia at the Olympics

References

Yugoslavia at the Olympics
Yugoslavia
Olympic flagbearers
Olympics